Bar Aftab (also Romanized as Bar Āftāb; also known as Bar Aftab Donbaleh Rood and Bar Āftāb-e Talkh Āb) is a village in Susan-e Gharbi Rural District, Susan District, Izeh County, Khuzestan Province, Iran. At the 2006 census, its population was 99, in 19 families.

References 

Populated places in Izeh County